Bostick School is a historic one-room school located near Ellerbe, Richmond County, North Carolina.  It was built about 1890, and is a one-story, gable-front frame building clad in weatherboard siding.  It measures approximately 26 feet by 36 feet. The structure ceased to operate as a school in 1922, and subsequently used as a peach packhouse, a tobacco barn, and a tool shed. The school building underwent a major restoration between the years 1992 and 1998.

It was listed on the National Register of Historic Places in 2005.

References

One-room schoolhouses in North Carolina
School buildings on the National Register of Historic Places in North Carolina
School buildings completed in 1890
Buildings and structures in Randolph County, North Carolina
National Register of Historic Places in Richmond County, North Carolina